Yot Ou (or Gnot-Ou) is a district (mueang) of Phongsaly province in northern Laos.

References

Districts of Phongsaly province